The Roman Catholic Diocese of Khandwa is a diocese located in the city of Khandwa in the Ecclesiastical province of Bhopal in India.

History
 February 3, 1977: Established as Diocese of Khandwa from the Diocese of Indore

Leadership
 Bishops of Khandwa (Latin Rite)
 Bishop A.A.S Durairaj (May 11, 2009 – October 4, 2021)
 Bishop Leo Cornelio (later Archbishop) (June 3, 1999 – June 15, 2007)
 Bishop Abraham Viruthakulangara (later Archbishop) (March 4, 1977 – January 17, 1998)

References

External links
 GCatholic.org 
 Catholic Hierarchy 

Roman Catholic dioceses in India
Christian organizations established in 1977
Roman Catholic dioceses and prelatures established in the 20th century
Christianity in Madhya Pradesh
1977 establishments in Madhya Pradesh
Khandwa